500 series may refer to the following:
 500 Series Shinkansen, a high-speed train type operated by West Japan Railway Company on the Tokaido Shinkansen and Sanyo Shinkansen lines in Japan
 Chichibu Railway 500 series, a Japanese train type operated by Chichibu Railway
 Tobu 500 series, a Japanese train type operated by Tobu Railway
 500-series format, a standardized format for modular audio signal processing equipment

Computing
 GeForce 500 Series graphic processing units
 Radeon RX 500 series graphic processing units
 ThinkPad 500 series, a line of laptop computers

See also
 Series 5 (disambiguation)
 500 (disambiguation)
 5000 series (disambiguation)